The 2018 NEAFL season was the eighth season of the North East Australian Football League (NEAFL). The season began on 7 April and concluded on 16 September 2018. The Grand Final was won by Southport, who defeated the Sydney Swans reserves by 55 points.

Ladder

Finals

Elimination Finals

Preliminary Finals

Grand Final
The grand final was dominated by Southport, and at three-quarter time the Sharks led 12.4 (76) to Sydney's 2.4 (16). Then, in the first thirty seconds of the final quarter, Sydney called for a head count, and Southport was found to have had nineteen men on the field due to an error when retaking the field after three-quarter time. In addition to a free kick, the Laws of the Game as written allowed for Southport's entire score to that point of 12.4 (76) to be reset to zero, but did not necessarily require it, with the decision to be made by NEAFL officials. The final quarter continued to be played onfield amid the uncertainty, while the NEAFL officials debated the rules; it was not until the 28th minute that officials confirmed that Southport's score would not be cancelled, concluding that the breach was immaterial to the game and should be treated as a routine interchange infringement, rather than the full too many men on the ground infraction. Southport won the game by 55 points.

The national Laws of the Game were amended after the season, removing the penalty under which a team's entire match score can be cancelled, and replacing it with a penalty under which only the score kicked during the quarter in which the infraction occurs would be cancelled.

See also 
 List of NEAFL premiers
 Australian rules football
 North East Australian Football League
 Australian Football League
 2018 AFL season

References

External links
 Season results

Australian rules football competition seasons
NEAFL